Ida Marko-Varga (born Mattsson; 10 March 1985) is a Swedish swimmer. She represents SK Triton.

Career
Marko-Varga was an early prospect, winning two individual freestyle titles at the 1998 Swedish Swimming Championships at the age of 13. The winning marks were 2:03.95 on 200-metre freestyle and 4:21.41 on the 400 m freestyle. She won all the five titles she contested for in the Swedish Youth Championships the same summer, although she was one year younger than the others in her age group. At the Swedish Youth Short Course Championships she won six individual titles and two relay medals, still being one year younger.

She won a bronze medal in the 200-metre freestyle event at the 2000 European Junior Swimming Championships, behind Irina Oufimtseva and Éva Risztov.

At the Athens 2004 Olympic Games she swam in the 4 × 200 m freestyle relay (with Josefin Lillhage, Malin Svahnström and Lotta Wänberg), finishing 8th in the final.

At the 2008 Summer Olympics she competed in individually 200 m freestyle and in the 4 × 100 m freestyle and the 4 × 200 m freestyle. She finished 16th individually and 8th with 4×200 relay team. The 4 × 100 m freestyle team didn't make the finals finishing 11th in the prelims.

Marko-Varga has been involved in two relay bronze medals at the Short Course World Championships, the 4 × 100 m freestyle relay in Shanghai 2006 and the 4 × 200 m freestyle relay at the 2004 Indianapolis championships. She has also earned two relay bronze medals at the European Championships, 4 × 200 m freestyle relay in Berlin 2002 and 4 × 100 m freestyle relay in Eindhoven 2008.

Clubs
SK Triton (2008–)
Trelleborgs SS
Malmö KK
SK Ran (−2008)

References

ESPN Profile

Olympic swimmers of Sweden
1985 births
Living people
Swimmers at the 2004 Summer Olympics
Swimmers at the 2008 Summer Olympics
Swimmers at the 2012 Summer Olympics
Swimmers at the 2016 Summer Olympics
Swedish female freestyle swimmers
Medalists at the FINA World Swimming Championships (25 m)
European Aquatics Championships medalists in swimming
SK Triton swimmers
Trelleborgs SS swimmers
Malmö KK swimmers
SK Ran swimmers
Sportspeople from Malmö
21st-century Swedish women